Sammy Davis Jr. Sings Mel Tormé's "California Suite" is a 1964 album by Sammy Davis Jr.

Track listing
All songs written by Mel Tormé and Robert Wells, except "California Suite" and "A Stranger in Town" (Tormé).

"California Suite" – 24:20
"A Stranger in Town" – 3:48
"A Stranger Called the Blues" – 4:04
"Welcome to the Club" – 3:26
"Willow Road" – 3:48
"Born to Be Blue" – 3:18
"The Christmas Song" – 3:21

Personnel
Sammy Davis Jr. – vocals
Marty Paich – arranger, conductor

1964 albums
Sammy Davis Jr. albums
Albums arranged by Marty Paich
Reprise Records albums
Albums conducted by Marty Paich